Vukosavljević is a Serbian surname. Notable people with the surname include:

Branislav Vukosavljević (1929–1985), Serbian footballer and manager
Rade Vukosavljević (born 1959), Serbian basketball player
Sava Vukosavljević (born 1996), Serbian footballer currently playing for Proleter Novi Sad
Vladan Vukosavljević (disambiguation), several people

Serbian surnames